The 22437 / 22438 Prayagraj - Anand Vihar Terminal Humsafar Express is a superfast express train of the Indian Railways connecting  in Uttar Pradesh and  in Delhi. It is currently being operated with 22437/22438 train numbers on tri-weekly basis.

Coach Composition 

The train comprises 14 3-tier AC, 4 Sleeper LHB coach along with two generator cars at each end. It has two screens in each coach displaying information about upcoming stations and passenger awareness. It is also equipped with CCTV cameras in each coach to ensure passenger safety.
Coach composition for 22437 :

Coach composition for 22438 :

It is having a rake sharing arrangement with 12275/76 Prayagraj New Delhi Humsafar Express.

Service

It averages 79 km/hr as 22437 Humsafar Express starts from  covering 622 km in 7 hrs 55 mins & 79 km/hr as 22438 Humsafar Express starts from  covering 622 km in 7 hrs 50 min. It has a maximum speed of 130 km/hr and it covers almost the entire journey at this speed.

Traction

Both trains are hauled by a WAP 7 of Ghaziabad Electric Locomotive Shed on its entire journey.

Route & Halts

See also

 Humsafar Express

References

External links 

 22438/Anand Vihar Terminal - Allahabad Humsafar Express
 22437/Allahabad - Anand Vihar Terminal Humsafar Express

Humsafar Express trains
Trains from Allahabad
Transport in Delhi
Rail transport in Uttar Pradesh
Railway services introduced in 2018
Rail transport in Delhi